Robert Mallet  (3 June 1810 – 5 November 1881) was an Irish geophysicist, civil engineer, and inventor who distinguished himself in research on earthquakes and is sometimes called the father of seismology. His son, Frederick Richard Mallet was a geologist who worked in India.

Early life
Mallet was born in Dublin, on 3 June 1810, the son of factory owner John Mallet. He was educated at Trinity College, Dublin, entering it at the age of 16 and graduating in science and mathematics in 1830 at the age of 20.

Career
Following his graduation, he joined his father's iron foundry business and helped build the firm into one of the most important engineering works in Ireland, supplying ironwork for railway companies, the Fastnet Rock lighthouse, and a swing bridge over the River Shannon at Athlone. He also helped manufacture the characteristic iron railings that surround Trinity College and which bear his family name at the base.

Mallet was elected to the Royal Irish Academy in 1832 at the early age of 22. He also enrolled in the British Association for the Advancement of Science in 1835 which helped finance much of his research in seismology.

In 1838 he became a life member of the Royal Geological Society of Ireland, and acted as its President from 1846–48. From 1848–1849 he constructed the Fastnet Rock lighthouse, southwest of Cape Clear.

Seismological work
On 9 February 1846 he presented to the Royal Irish Academy his paper, "On the Dynamics of Earthquakes", which is considered to be one of the foundations of modern seismology. He is also credited with coining the word "seismology" and other related words e.g. the isoseismal map, which he used in his research. He also coined the term epicentre.

From 1852 to 1858, he was engaged (with his son, John William Mallet) in the preparation of his work, The Earthquake Catalogue of the British Association (1858), and carried out blasting experiments to determine the speed of seismic propagation in sand and solid rock.

On 16 December 1857, the area around Padula, Italy, was devastated by the Great Neapolitan earthquake which caused 11,000 deaths. At the time it was the third largest known earthquake in the world and has been estimated to have been of magnitude 7.0 on the Moment magnitude scale. Mallet, with letters of support from Charles Lyell and Charles Darwin, petitioned the Royal Society of London and received a grant of £150 to go to Padula and record at first hand the devastation. The resulting report was presented to the Royal Society as the Report on the Great Neapolitan Earthquake of 1857. It was a major scientific work and made great use of the then new research tool of photography to record the devastation caused by the earthquake. In 1862, he published the "Great Neapolitan Earthquake of 1857: The First Principles of Observational Seismology" in two volumes; he brought forward evidence to show that the depth below the Earth's surface, from where the impulse of the Neapolitan earthquake originated, was about 8–9 geographical miles.

One of Mallet's papers was Volcanic Energy: an Attempt to develop its True Origin and Cosmical Relations, in which he sought to show that volcanic heat may be attributed to the effects of crushing, contortion and other disturbances in the crust of the earth; the disturbances leading to the formation of lines of fracture, more or less vertical, down which water would find its way, and if the temperature generated be sufficient volcanic eruptions of steam or lava would follow.

Other work

The huge mortar was built in sections to allow transport, but was too late to be used in action. An example has been preserved at the Royal Artillery base in Woolwich and one is displayed before the Royal Armouries Fort Nelson near Portsmouth.

Mallet was elected Fellow of the Royal Society in 1854, and in 1861 moved to London, where he became a consulting engineer and edited The Practical Mechanic's Journal. He was awarded the Telford Medal by the Institution of Civil Engineers in 1859, followed by the Cunningham Medal of the Royal Irish Academy for his research into the theory of earthquakes in 1862 and the Wollaston medal of the Geological Society of London in 1877, the Geological Society's highest award.

Blind for the last seven years of his life, he died at Stockwell, London, on 5 November 1881 and is buried at West Norwood Cemetery.

Notes

External links

 Victorian Forts description
 Robert Mallet and his family at Mallett family history
 
 

1810 births
1881 deaths
19th-century Irish people
Irish geologists
Irish geophysicists
Irish civil engineers
Fellows of the Royal Society
People from County Dublin
Burials at West Norwood Cemetery
Seismologists
Wollaston Medal winners
Weapon designers
Members of the Royal Irish Academy